Diggle may refer to:

People
 Andy Diggle, British comic book writer and former editor of 2000 AD
 Angus Diggle (born 1956), British former solicitor
 Steve Diggle (born 1955), English guitarist and vocalist in the punk band Buzzcocks

Fictional
 Dedalus Diggle, a member of the Order of the Phoenix in the Harry Potter universe
 John Diggle (character), a fictional character from the TV series Arrow

Other
 Diggle, Greater Manchester, a village in Saddleworth parish, Metropolitan Borough of Oldham, Greater Manchester, England
 Diggle railway station
 Diggles: The Myth of Fenris, a game released by Innonics on 27 September 2001
 A race of burrowing bird monsters from the rpg roguelike Dungeons of Dredmor